"Successor ideology" is a term coined by essayist Wesley Yang to describe an emergent ideology within left-wing political movements in the United States centered around intersectionality, social justice, identity politics, and anti-racism, which is supposedly replacing conventional liberal values of pluralism, freedom of speech, color blindness, and free inquiry. Proponents of the concept link it to an alleged growth in the intolerance of differing opinions, to cancel culture, "wokeness," "social justice warriors", and to the far left; Yang himself describes it bluntly as "authoritarian Utopianism that masquerades as liberal humanism while usurping it from within."

The thesis has garnered support from some commentators, with Roger Berkowitz linking it to a broader retreat of liberalism worldwide—challenged from the left in the form of the successor ideology and from the right in the form of illiberal democracy—and with Matt Taibbi calling the ideas of those he associates with the ideology "toxic" and "unattractive", for instance. The concept, however, has also come under criticism, with some commentators arguing that the term does not accurately describe trends within left-wing movements and others considering it a reactionary concept.

Origins
The term was coined by political writer Wesley Yang in a March 4, 2019 Twitter thread discussing diversity in college admissions and among the professional-managerial class; following a tweet arguing that the end-point of an emergent racial ideology is "critical race theory", Yang stated, "This successor ideology has been a rival to the meritocratic one and has in recent years acquired sufficient power to openly seek hegemony on campuses and elsewhere." He expanded on the term in further tweets in May 2019 and in a 2021 blog post, and has appeared on podcasts by The Wall Street Journal and the Manhattan Institute to promote it.

Criticism
Sarah Jeong, writing in The Verge, has argued that the term 'successor ideology' "seems to only muddy the waters since the thing that [critics of the 'successor ideology'] are concerned about isn’t actually a concrete ideology but an inchoate social force with the hallmarks of religious revival."

Political writer Osita Nwanevu contends that, counter to the narrative that the successor ideology is fundamentally illiberal, it is actually those who are identified with it who are "protecting—indeed expanding—the bounds of liberalism," while it those who oppose it—whom he calls "reactionaries"—who are "most guilty of the illiberalism they claim has overtaken the American Left."

See also 
Regressive left
 Woke capitalism

References

External links
 The Successor Ideology — 2020 video by the Manhattan Institute featuring Ross Douthat, Wesley Yang, Coleman Hughes, and Reihan Salam

Political culture
Left-wing politics
Liberalism
Social liberalism
Progressivism